Stacchini is an Italian surname. Notable people with the surname include:

Gino Stacchini (born 1938), Italian footballer
Riccardo Stacchini (born 1965), Sammarinese alpine skier
Ulisse Stacchini (1871–1947), Italian architect

Italian-language surnames